Duchess of Marlborough is a title held by the wives of the Dukes of Marlborough and may refer to: 

 Sarah Churchill, Duchess of Marlborough (née Jenyns, 1660–1744), wife of the 1st Duke
 Henrietta Godolphin, 2nd Duchess of Marlborough (1681–1733), suo jure Duchess, daughter of the 1st Duke
 Elizabeth Spencer, Duchess of Marlborough (née Trevor, died 1761), wife of the 3rd Duke
 Caroline Spencer, Duchess of Marlborough (née Russell, 1742–1811), wife of the 4th Duke
 Susan Spencer-Churchill, Duchess of Marlborough (née Stewart, 1767–1841), wife of the 5th Duke
 Jane Spencer-Churchill, Duchess of Marlborough (1798–1844) (née Stewart), first wife of the 6th Duke
 The Hon. Charlotte Augusta Flower (1818–1850), second wife of the 6th Duke
 Jane Francis Clinton Stewart (1817–1897), third wife of the 6th Duke
 Frances Anne Spencer-Churchill, Duchess of Marlborough (née Vane, 1822–1899), wife of the 7th Duke
 Albertha Spencer-Churchill, Duchess of Marlborough (née Hamilton, 1847–1932), first wife of the 8th Duke
 Lily Spencer-Churchill, Duchess of Marlborough (née Price, 1854–1909), second wife of the 8th Duke
 Consuelo Vanderbilt (1877–1964), first wife of the 9th Duke
 Gladys Spencer-Churchill, Duchess of Marlborough (née Deacon, 1881–1977), second wife of the 9th Duke
 The Hon. Alexandra Mary Cadogan (1900–1961), first wife of the 10th Duke
 Laura Spencer-Churchill, Duchess of Marlborough (née Charteris, 1915–1990), second wife of the 10th Duke 
 Rosita Spencer-Churchill, Duchess of Marlborough (née Douglas, born 1943), third wife of the 11th Duke
 Lily Mahtani (born 1957), fourth wife of the 11th Duke
 Edla Spencer-Churchill, Duchess of Marlborough (née Griffiths, born 1968), second wife of the 12th Duke

Other uses
Duchess of Marlborough (Fabergé egg)